A Wife or Two is a 1936 British comedy film directed by Maclean Rogers and starring Henry Kendall, Nancy Burne and Betty Astell. It was made as a quota quickie at Beaconsfield Studios.

Cast
 Henry Kendall as Charles Marlowe  
 Nancy Burne as Margaret Marlowe  
 Betty Astell as Mary Hamilton  
 Fred Duprez as Sam Hickleberry  
 Garry Marsh as George Hamilton  
 Ena Grossmith
 Wally Patch 
 Leo Sheffield

References

Bibliography
 Low, Rachael. Filmmaking in 1930s Britain. George Allen & Unwin, 1985.
 Wood, Linda. British Films, 1927-1939. British Film Institute, 1986.

External links

1936 films
British comedy films
1936 comedy films
Films directed by Maclean Rogers
Films shot at Beaconsfield Studios
Quota quickies
British black-and-white films
1930s English-language films
1930s British films